Andrei Mikhailovich Nikitin (born 24 March 1980) is a former Russian professional footballer.

Club career
He made his debut in the Russian Premier League in 2002 for FC Torpedo-ZIL Moscow.

External links
 

1980 births
Footballers from Moscow
Living people
Russian footballers
Association football defenders
FC Moscow players
FC Fakel Voronezh players
FC Salyut Belgorod players
Russian Premier League players
FC Metallurg Lipetsk players
FC Spartak Tambov players
FC Lukhovitsy players